Nona Mamulashvili (born 13 March 1977) is a Georgian political figure.

In November 2020 Nona was elected a member of Parliament of Georgia by party list, bloc: "United National Movement – United Opposition, Strength is in Unity". 

Her brother, Mamuka Mamulashvili, is a commander of the Georgian Legion in the Russo-Ukrainian War.

References

External links
 Her biography on official site of the Parliament of Georgia

1977 births
Living people
Members of the Parliament of Georgia
United National Movement (Georgia) politicians
21st-century politicians from Georgia (country)